Henry Forbes Summers (18 August 1911 in Harrogate, Yorkshire – 22 December 2005 in Basingstoke, Hampshire), aka Hal Summers, was a senior British civil servant. He published several volumes of poetry.

Summers was educated at Fettes College, Edinburgh and Trinity College, Oxford. He joined the Ministry of Health in 1935.  He was Private Secretary to Aneurin Bevan while he was Minister of Health, during the passage of the National Health Bill, 1945.

He moved to the Ministry of Housing and Local Government on its creation and was promoted to Under-Secretary in 1955.  This ministry was later absorbed into the Department of the Environment.  He was made a CB in 1961 and retired in 1971.

Publications 
Smoke After Flame, 1944
Hinterland, 1947
Poems in Pamphlet IV: Visions of Time, 1952
Tomorrow is my Love, 1978
The Burning Book, 1982
Brevities, 1991

His most popular poems include "My Old Cat" (voted one of Britain's favourite 20th-century poems in a BBC poll), "The Beginners" and "The Seed".

References
 Who was Who

External links 

Private secretaries in the British Civil Service
Civil servants in the Ministry of Health (United Kingdom)
Civil servants in the Ministry of Housing and Local Government
Civil servants in the Department of the Environment
Companions of the Order of the Bath
1911 births
2005 deaths
People educated at Fettes College
Alumni of Trinity College, Oxford
English male poets
20th-century English poets
20th-century English male writers